Eudora School District may refer to:

United States
 Eudora School District (Arkansas) — Eudora, Arkansas
 Eudora USD 491 — Eudora, Kansas